Kaasi is a 2004 Telugu drama film, starring J. D. Chakravarthy and Keerti Chawla.

Cast
 J. D. Chakravarthy as Kaasi
 Keerthi Chawla as Anjali
 Devan as GK
 Brahmanandam as Kankipadu Kanta Rao
 Uttej as Swati Mutyam
 Shiva Reddy as DTS
 Venu Madhav as Okkadu
 Varsha as Swati
 AVS
 G. V. Sudhakar Naidu as Police Officer
 Shanoor Sana

Soundtrack

References

External links
http://www.idlebrain.com/movie/archive/mr-kaasi.html

2004 films
2000s Telugu-language films